The list caves in Bulgaria, as of 2002, includes around 4,500 underground formations. The earliest written records about the caves in Bulgaria are found in the manuscripts of the 17th century Bulgarian National Revival figure and historian Petar Bogdan. The first Bulgarian speleological society was established in 1929. The caves in the country are inhabited by more than 700 invertebrate species and 32 of the 37 species of bats found in Europe.

The longest caves in Bulgaria are Duhlata (18,200 m) and Orlova Chuka (13,437 m). The first show cave is Bacho Kiro, inaugurated in 1937. Nowadays, there are 10 tourist caves accessible to the public for guided visits in Bulgaria.

Partial list of Bulgarian caves

See also

Geography of Bulgaria
 List of caves
List of protected areas of Bulgaria
List of mountains in Bulgaria
List of rock formations in Bulgaria
List of islands of Bulgaria
List of lakes of Bulgaria
 Speleology

Citations

Sources 
 Caves in Bulgaria

 
Bulgaria
Caves